Oja's learning rule, or simply Oja's rule, named after Finnish computer scientist Erkki Oja, is a model of how neurons in the brain or in artificial neural networks change connection strength, or learn, over time. It is a modification of the standard Hebb's Rule (see Hebbian learning) that, through multiplicative normalization, solves all stability problems and generates an algorithm for principal components analysis. This is a computational form of an effect which is believed to happen in biological neurons.

Theory
Oja's rule requires a number of simplifications to derive, but in its final form it is demonstrably stable, unlike Hebb's rule. It is a single-neuron special case of the Generalized Hebbian Algorithm. However, Oja's rule can also be generalized in other ways to varying degrees of stability and success.

Formula
Consider a simplified model of a neuron  that returns a linear combination of its inputs  using presynaptic weights :

Oja's rule defines the change in presynaptic weights  given the output response  of a neuron to its inputs  to be

where  is the learning rate which can also change with time. Note that the bold symbols are vectors and  defines a discrete time iteration. The rule can also be made for continuous iterations as

Derivation
The simplest learning rule known is Hebb's rule, which states in conceptual terms that neurons that fire together, wire together. In component form as a difference equation, it is written

, 
or in scalar form with implicit  -dependence,
,

where  is again the output, this time explicitly dependent on its input vector .

Hebb's rule has synaptic weights approaching infinity with a positive learning rate. We can stop this by normalizing the weights so that each weight's magnitude is restricted between 0, corresponding to no weight, and 1, corresponding to being the only input neuron with any weight. We do this by normalizing the weight vector to be of length one:

.

Note that in Oja's original paper, corresponding to quadrature (root sum of squares), which is the familiar Cartesian normalization rule. However, any type of normalization, even linear, will give the same result without loss of generality.

.

For small , our higher-order terms  go to zero.

.

,

which, when substituted into our expansion, gives Oja's rule, or

.

Stability and PCA
In analyzing the convergence of a single neuron evolving by Oja's rule, one extracts the first principal component, or feature, of a data set. Furthermore, with extensions using the Generalized Hebbian Algorithm, one can create a multi-Oja neural network that can extract as many features as desired, allowing for principal components analysis.

.

The variance of outputs of our Oja neuron  then converges with time iterations to the principal eigenvalue, or

.

These results are derived using Lyapunov function analysis, and they show that Oja's neuron necessarily converges on strictly the first principal component if certain conditions are met in our original learning rule. Most importantly, our learning rate  is allowed to vary with time, but only such that its sum is divergent but its power sum is convergent, that is

.

Generalizations
Recently, in the context of associative learning, it has been shown that the Hebbian rule, which is similar to Oja's rule, can be generalized using an Ising-like model: The main idea of the generalization is based on formulating the energy function like in Ising model and then applying stochastic gradient descent algorithm to it. The energy function and the update rule corresponding to the following derivative are given by:

,

,

where:
,  is the coupling among inputs,  is the correlation strength between the model and the output,  corresponds to the presence of an external magnetic field,  determines the connections among inputs.

The formula then reduces to:

,

Applications
Oja's rule was originally described in Oja's 1982 paper, but the principle of self-organization to which it is applied is first attributed to Alan Turing in 1952. PCA has also had a long history of use before Oja's rule formalized its use in network computation in 1989. The model can thus be applied to any problem of self-organizing mapping, in particular those in which feature extraction is of primary interest. Therefore, Oja's rule has an important place in image and speech processing. It is also useful as it expands easily to higher dimensions of processing, thus being able to integrate multiple outputs quickly. A canonical example is its use in binocular vision.

Biology and Oja's subspace rule
There is clear evidence for both long-term potentiation and long-term depression in biological neural networks, along with a normalization effect in both input weights and neuron outputs. However, while there is no direct experimental evidence yet of Oja's rule active in a biological neural network, a biophysical derivation of a generalization of the rule is possible. Such a derivation requires retrograde signalling from the postsynaptic neuron, which is biologically plausible (see neural backpropagation), and takes the form of

Note that the angle brackets denote the average and the ∗ operator is a convolution. By taking the pre- and post-synaptic functions into frequency space and combining integration terms with the convolution, we find that this gives an arbitrary-dimensional generalization of Oja's rule known as Oja's Subspace, namely

See also
BCM theory
Contrastive Hebbian learning
Generalized Hebbian algorithm
Independent components analysis
Principal components analysis
Self-organizing map
Synaptic plasticity

References

External links
Oja, Erkki: Oja learning rule in Scholarpedia
Oja, Erkki: Aalto University

Computational neuroscience
Artificial neural networks
Neural circuits
Biophysics
Hebbian theory
Management cybernetics